The 2021 Wawa 250 was the 23rd stock car race of the 2021 NASCAR Xfinity Series season, and the 20th iteration of the event. The race was held in Daytona Beach, Florida at Daytona International Speedway on both days of August 27-28, after rain delayed the race on August 27 after lap 17. The race took 100 laps to complete. Kaulig Racing would dominate the event, with them winning all stages, and with Justin Haley eventually winning the race, with A. J. Allmendinger finishing 2nd and Jeb Burton 4th. To fill in the rest of the podium positions, Justin Allgaier of JR Motorsports finished 3rd. The race ended with a 3-wide finish for the win.

Background 
Daytona International Speedway is one of three superspeedways to hold NASCAR races, the other two being Indianapolis Motor Speedway and Talladega Superspeedway. The standard track at Daytona International Speedway is a four-turn superspeedway that is 2.5 miles (4.0 km) long. The track's turns are banked at 31 degrees, while the front stretch, the location of the finish line, is banked at 18 degrees.

Entry list

Qualifying 
Qualifying was based on a metric qualifying system based on the previous race, the 2021 New Holland 250. As a result, A. J. Allmendinger of Kaulig Racing would win the pole.

Timmy Hill and Dillon Bassett would not have enough points based on the metric system to qualify for the race.

Race results 
Stage 1 Laps: 30

Stage 2 Laps: 30

Stage 3 Laps: 40

References 

2021 NASCAR Xfinity Series
NASCAR races at Daytona International Speedway
Wawa 250
Wawa 250